John Wattie  was Dean of Aberdeen and Orkney from 1948  to 1953.

He was educated at King's College London and ordained in 1909. After  curacies in Clapton Park   and Aberdeen he held  incumbencies  in  Kirkwall, Cambuslang, Dundee and Aboyne until his appointment as Dean.

Notes

Alumni of King's College London
Associates of King's College London
Deans of Aberdeen and Orkney